Artsyom Kosak (born 22 February 1977) is a retired Belarusian professional footballer and coach.

Honours
Lokomotiv-96 Vitebsk
Belarusian Cup winner: 1997–98

External links

Profile at teams.by

1977 births
Living people
Belarusian footballers
FC Partizan Minsk players
FC Vitebsk players
FC Molodechno players
FC Slavia Mozyr players
FC Lokomotiv Vitebsk (defunct) players
Association football defenders